Wolfhagen station is a railway station in the municipality of Wolfhagen, located in the Kassel district in Hesse, Germany.

References

Railway stations in Hesse
Buildings and structures in Kassel (district)
Railway stations in Germany opened in 1897